Poe Dam is a concrete gravity diversion dam on the North Fork Feather River, about  north of Lake Oroville in Butte County, California in the United States. Completed in 1959, the dam is the lowermost component of the Pacific Gas and Electric Company's Feather River Canyon Power Project, a system of 10 hydroelectric stations along the North Fork.

The dam diverts water through an  tunnel to the 120 megawatt Poe Powerhouse, located on the upper reaches of Lake Oroville.

On November 8, 2018, the Camp Fire, a destructive wildfire that destroyed the nearby community of  Concow and the town of Paradise and caused multiple deaths, originated close to Poe Dam at the location of downed power lines across the Feather River. In an initial comment, PG&E stated that a cause of the fire had not been determined yet and that there would be an investigation.

Poe Dam is a popular kayaking site.

See also

List of dams and reservoirs in California

Weblinks

References

Dams in California
Dams completed in 1953
Dams in the Feather River basin
Gravity dams
Hydroelectric power plants in California
1953 establishments in California